Commodore Charles Alfred Bartlett  (21 August 1868 – 15 February 1945) was a merchant seaman and Royal Naval Reserve officer, who achieved command status with the White Star Line shipping company, including as captain of .

Biography 

Born in London, Bartlett served six years with the British-India Steam Navigation Company before joining the White Star Line in 1894. He was appointed as an officer in the Royal Naval Reserve in 1893. He is perhaps best remembered as the captain of the Britannic from 1915 to November 1916, when the ship was sunk off Greece by a German-laid mine. After the war he served as Royal Naval Reserve aide-de-camp to King George V. Bartlett was known as "Iceberg Charlie" to his crew due to his alleged ability to detect icebergs miles away. He retired in 1931 and died in a nursing home in Waterloo near Liverpool on 15 February 1945 at age 76.

In popular culture

Captain Bartlett was portrayed by John Rhys-Davies in the 2000 Fox Family Channel movie Britannic. However, in the film his name is spelled "Barrett", probably mistaken for Titanic's surviving head stoker "Fred Barrett".

References

External links
webpage on Britannic with photo of Captain Bartlett
formal portrait

1868 births
1945 deaths
Commanders of the Order of the British Empire
Companions of the Order of the Bath
Steamship captains
Sailors from London
Royal Naval Reserve personnel